Crotalus scutulatus (common names: Mojave rattlesnake, Mojave green,) is a highly venomous pit viper species found in the deserts of the southwestern United States and central Mexico. It is perhaps best known for its potent neurotoxic-hemotoxic venom, which is considered the world's most potent rattlesnake venom.

Two subspecies are recognized, including the nominate subspecies described here.

Description

The color varies from shades of brown to pale green depending on the surroundings. The green hue found among Mojave rattlesnakes has led to them being known as "Mojave greens" in some areas. Like C. atrox (the western diamondback rattlesnake), which it closely resembles, C. scutulatus has a dark diamond pattern along its back. With C. scutulatus, the white bands on the tail tend to be wider than the black, while the band width is usually more equal in C. atrox.  Additionally, C. scutulatus has enlarged scales on top of the head between the supraoculars, and the light postocular stripe passes behind the corner of the mouth. In C. atrox, the crown is covered in small scales, and the light postocular stripe intersects the mouth.

Campbell and Lamar (2004)  support the English name "Mohave (Mojave) rattlesnake", but do so with some reluctance because so little of the snake's range lies within the Mojave Desert. They do not support the spelling "Mojave", because the name "Mohave" derives from the Native American term hamakhava.

Geographic range
 This snake is found in the southwestern United States in southern California, southern Nevada, northern and eastern Nevada,extreme southwestern Utah, most of Arizona, southern New Mexico, and some of Texas. It also ranges southward through much of Mexico to southern Puebla. It is found in deserts and other areas with xeric vegetation from near sea level to about 2500 m altitude. No type locality is given. Smith and Taylor (1950) proposed "Wickenburg, Maricopa County, Arizona" (USA), while Schmidt (1953) listed the type locality as "Mojave Desert, California" (USA).

Habitat
Primarily a snake of high desert or lower mountain slopes, it is often found near scrub brush such as sage, mesquite and creosote, but may also reside in lowland areas of sparse vegetation, among cacti, Joshua tree forests, or grassy plains. It can also range up the Eastern Sierra as far north as Reno and perhaps beyond into southern Eastern Oregon.  It tends to avoid densely vegetated and rocky areas, preferring open, arid habitats.

Conservation status
This species is classified as Least Concern (LC) on the IUCN Red List of Threatened Species (v3.1, 2001). Species are listed as such due to their wide distribution, presumed large population, or because they are unlikely to be declining fast enough to qualify for listing in a more threatened category. The population trend was stable when assessed in 2007.

Behavior

C. scutulatus is most active from April to September, and brumates alone or in small groups during the winter. Ambush predators, they eat mostly small rodents and lizards. Females bear live young, from two to 17 (average about eight), from July through September. They have a reputation for being aggressive towards people and will defend themselves vigorously when disturbed.

Venom

Lethality
The Mojave rattlesnake is the world's most venomous rattlesnake. The most common subspecies of the Mojave rattlesnake has both neurotoxic (nervous system and brain) and hemotoxic (tissue and muscle destruction) venom which is considered to be one of the most debilitating and potentially deadly of all rattlesnakes, and even matching several elapids. However, chances for survival are very good if medical attention is sought as soon as possible after a bite.  There have been reported incidents in Red Mountain California of people finding dead snakes, getting pricked by fangs and succumbing to postmortem envenomations.

Prognosis for bite victims
In people bitten by venom A Mojave rattlesnakes (those outside the relatively small Venom B area in south-central Arizona), the onset of serious signs and symptoms can be delayed, sometimes leading to an initial underestimation of the severity of the bite. Significant envenomations (as with all snakebites, the quantity of venom injected is highly variable and unpredictable) can produce vision abnormalities and difficulty swallowing and speaking. In severe cases, skeletal muscle weakness can lead to difficulty breathing and even respiratory failure. Contrary to popular belief, fatalities are uncommon. This is largely due to the wide availability of antivenom, although estimates for mortality in the early 1900s ranged from 5-25% for all snake bites in the United States.

Antivenin
Unlike the rattlesnake antivenin used in the United States over the previous 50 years, CroFab antivenin (approved by the US Food and Drug Administration in October 2001) uses Mojave rattlesnake venom A (in addition to venom from three other species) in its manufacture, making it particularly effective for treatment of venom A Mojave rattlesnake bites. Antibodies in CroFab produced by the other three species' venoms effectively neutralize Mojave rattlesnake venom B.

Unique venom characteristics
All rattlesnake venoms are complex cocktails of enzymes and other proteins that vary greatly in composition and effects, not only between species, but also between geographic populations within the same species. C. scutulatus is widely regarded as producing one of the most toxic snake venoms in the New World, based on  studies in laboratory mice. The median lethal dose is 0.23 mg/kg SC.  The estimated lethal dose for an adult human is just 10 to 15 mg.

Their potent venom is the result of a presynaptic neurotoxin composed of two distinct peptide subunits. The basic subunit (a phospholipase A2) is mildly toxic and apparently rather common in North American rattlesnake venoms. The less common acidic subunit is not toxic by itself, but in combination with the basic subunit, produces the potent neurotoxin called "Mojave toxin". Nearly identical neurotoxins have been discovered in five North American rattlesnake species besides C. scutulatus. However, not all populations express both subunits. The venom of many Mojave rattlesnakes from south-central Arizona lacks the acidic subunit and has been designated "venom B", while Mojave rattlesnakes tested from all other areas express both subunits and have been designated "venom A" populations.

Venom differences
Based on median LD50 values in lab mice, venom A from subspecies A Mojave rattlesnakes is more than ten times as toxic as venom B, from type B Mojave green rattlesnakes, which lacks Mojave toxin. Medical treatment as soon as possible after a bite is critical to a positive outcome, dramatically increasing chances for survival.

However, venom B causes pronounced proteolytic and hemorrhagic effects, similar to the bites of other rattlesnake species; these effects are significantly reduced or absent from bites by venom A snakes. Risk to life and limb is still significant, as with all rattlesnakes, if not treated as soon as possible after a bite.

Subspecies

The subspecific name, salvini, is in honor of English herpetologist Osbert Salvin.

References

External links

 
 Mojave Rattlesnake, Crotalus scutulatus  at AZ PARC. Accessed 3 February 2007.
 Snake Envenomations, Mojave Rattle at eMedicine. Accessed 3 February 2007.
 Mojave Rattlesnake at Blue Planet Biomes. Accessed 3 February 2007.
 Crotalus scutulatus at Herps of Texas . Accessed 3 February 2007.
 Why study Mohave Rattlesnakes? at Michael Cardwell homepage. Accessed 3 February 2007.
 Identifying C. scutulatus and C. atrox at Jeff's Big Bend National Park page. Accessed 8 April 2007.
 Account of severe C. scutulatus envenomation at venomousreptiles.org. Accessed 6 December 2007.

scutulatus
Fauna of the Colorado Desert
Fauna of the Mojave Desert
Fauna of the Sonoran Desert
Fauna of the Chihuahuan Desert
Reptiles described in 1861
Taxa named by Robert Kennicott